Nassau Brewing Company, also known as the Budweiser Brewing Company of Brooklyn and Bedford Brewery, is a historic brewery complex located in the Crown Heights neighborhood of Brooklyn, Kings County, New York. It consists of two remaining 
industrial buildings dating from the 1860s to the 1880s and are in the Rundbogenstil and Romanesque Revival style.  The brick buildings are two to six stories and form an "L"-shape. The buildings feature substantial underground brick vaults originally constructed for the aging of lager beer at near-freezing temperatures. The brewery closed in 1916. The earlier sections are vacant and the 1880s elements were rehabilitated as apartments and offices in the 2000s.

It was listed on the National Register of Historic Places in 2014.

References

Industrial buildings and structures on the National Register of Historic Places in New York City
Industrial buildings completed in 1910
Romanesque Revival architecture in New York City
National Register of Historic Places in Brooklyn
Companies that filed for Chapter 11 bankruptcy in 2021